Tate's Barn is a historic barn in Camden, Arkansas. It is located on the Oakland Farm, a  property off Oakland Street, belonging to the Tate family, who were among Ouachita County's first American settlers. The barn, probably built in the 1880s, is a cypress structure with a complex floor plan spanning five levels. Two sheds are attached to the barn, one housing horse stalls, the other farm implements.

The barn was listed on the National Register of Historic Places in 1972.

See also
National Register of Historic Places listings in Ouachita County, Arkansas

References

Barns on the National Register of Historic Places in Arkansas
Buildings and structures completed in 1880
Buildings and structures in Camden, Arkansas
National Register of Historic Places in Ouachita County, Arkansas
1880 establishments in Arkansas